André Tulard (1899–1967) was a French civil administrator and police inspector. He is known for having created the "Tulard files," which censused Jews in Vichy France. Tulard was head of the Service of Foreigners and Jewish Affairs at the Prefecture of Police of Paris.

Although Tulard was an active collaborator with the Germans he received no punishment after the war, and even retained his title as Chevalier (Knight) of the Légion d'Honneur.

The Tulard files (fichier Tulard)
Tulard created the first files, censusing members of the French Communist Party (PCF), for the Prefecture of Police under the Third Republic (1871–1940). He created another one, under Vichy, which listed Jews. These files were then handed over to Theodor Dannecker, head of the Gestapo in Paris.

Following a Nazi ordinance dated 21 September 1940, which forced Jews in the "occupied zone" to declare themselves as such in police office or sub-prefectures (sous-préfectures), Vichy promulgated on 3 October 1940 the first Jewish Status. In the sole department of the Seine, encompassing Paris and its immediate suburbs, nearly 150,000 persons presented themselves to the police offices. The registrations were then centralized by the French police, who created, under the direction of inspector Tulard, a central filing system. According to the Dannecker report, "this filing system subdivided it into files alphabetically classed, Jews with French nationality and foreign Jews having files of different colours, and the files were also classed according to profession, nationality and street" (of residency). These files were then handed over to section IV J of the Gestapo, in charge of the "Jewish problem." They were then used by the Gestapo on various raids, among them the August 1941 raid in the 11th arrondissement of Paris, during which 3,200 foreign Jews and 1,000 French Jews were interned in various camps, including Drancy.

Along with many French police officers, André Tulard was present on the day of the inauguration of Drancy internment camp, which would be the last stop before Auschwitz for the Jewish people captured in France, in the huge majority by the French police itself. Tulard also participated to the logistics concerning the attribution of the yellow badges, made mandatory by the Vichy status on Jewish people.

After the collapse of Vichy France and the end of the War, Tulard was one of the active collaborators with the Germans who received no punishment, and even retained his title as Chevalier (Knight) of the Légion d'Honneur.

André Tulard was a diligent civil servant educated in the law. Cooperating with German officials, he oversaw the development of a registry for Jews at the Paris municipal police headquarters in fall 1940. More than 110 people, mostly women, created the cards—blue for French-born Jews and orange for the more vulnerable foreign-born Jews—and pulled the cards identifying Jews to be rounded up for deportation “to the East.” At the end of the war, French authorities suspended Tulard, but he was reinstated, perhaps helped by a petition stating that he was “never antisemitic.”

See also 
Drancy internment camp
Theodor Dannecker
IBM during World War II

References

Sources 
Maurice Rajsfus, La Police de Vichy — Les forces de l'ordre françaises au service de la Gestapo, 1940/1944, Le Cherche Midi éditeurs, 1995  (Rajsfus is a French historian, specialist of the history of the police. He was called for during the trial of Maurice Papon).
Sonia Combe, Les fichiers de juifs. De la dissimulation à la désinformation in la revue Lignes, n°23, octobre 1994, pp. 93–127

External links 
France 5 
PDF, cf. « Le numéro INSEE: de la mobilisation clandestine (1940) au projet Safari (1974) », article by Michel Louis Lévy published in issue n°86 of the Dossiers et recherches of the INED statistics institute 

1899 births
1967 deaths
French collaborators with Nazi Germany
Holocaust perpetrators in France
Chevaliers of the Légion d'honneur
Police misconduct in France
French politicians convicted of crimes